Riley Uggla (/ˈraɪli Uggla; born 28 May 1995) is a British-Canadian designer. She is the founder of sustainable luxury fashion brand Riley Studio.

Early life 
Uggla was born in Toronto, Canada and grew up in the United Kingdom. She is the second youngest of four siblings. Uggla studied at Bradfield College, Berkshire, before enrolling in the Foundation in Fashion course at Istituto Marangoni in Shoreditch, London.

Career 
In 2014, Uggla began her career as a television personality, best known for her appearance in the Channel 4 series Made in Chelsea.

In August 2018, Uggla founded her first company, Riley Studio. As well as being the founder, Uggla also acts as the Creative Director of the company and oversees all design processes and brand direction.

Philanthropy 
The Uggla Foundation was founded in April 2020 by Riley Uggla, her three siblings and their father. The foundation focuses on three main areas: education, health, and access to the arts. One of the first targeted initiatives is the establishment of scholarships for exceptionally talented individuals who do not have the financial means to attend higher education. 

The scholarships are awarded through The Uggla Family Scholarship programme at the London School of Economics and Simon Fraser University.

References 

Living people
1995 births
Artists from Toronto
British company founders
British fashion designers
Canadian emigrants to England
Canadian expatriates in England